Desulfobacter halotolerans is a halotolerant, acetate-oxidizing, sulfate-reducing bacteria. It is mesophilic and rod-shaped, with type strain GSL-Ac1.

References

Further reading

External links

LPSN
Type strain of Desulfobacter halotolerans at BacDive -  the Bacterial Diversity Metadatabase

Desulfobacterales
Bacteria described in 1998